Dilalpur union is a union of Bajitpur upazila of Kishoreganj district of Dhaka division of Bangladesh. It is a very old union. It is located on the bank of river Ghorautra.

During the British period, the river port of Dilalpur was famous in the subcontinent. Many ships used to sail here every day. During the reign of Nawab Alivardi Khan, the famous scholar of the subcontinent, Maulvi Ubedul Hasan, was born here.

History

During the British period the naval port of Dilalpur Union in Bajitpur Upazila became famous.

Demographics

Dilalpur Union consists of 24 villages covering a total area of 10.55 km2.

According to the Bangladesh Bureau of Statistics (BBS) as of January 27, 2001

Total Population is 16,006
Literacy Rate 32.48   %  
Gross Enrolment Ratio of Primary Education 40.11     
Girls Enrolment Ratio of Primary Education 43.45     
Unemployment Ratio 26.77   Person  
Sanitation Coverage 38.49     
Safe Drinking Water:  90.35% household  
Electricity Coverage: 30.38% household  

Administration

Name of the villages in Dilalpur Union-
 Saser Dighi
 Kurerpar
 Puran hati
 Maijpar
 Noapara

 Shahanagar
 Alirhati
 Fulbaria
 Mollapara
 Rotonpur
 Santer Kanda
 Nagar Dilalpur
 Bagpara
 Bhahernagar/porbo para poute bare
 Boro Khotula
 Doria Kandi
 Gupartyar Nagar
 Jaloapara
 Kamaria Vita
 Khalahati
 Khatera
 Maha Mirerbag
 Tatal Char
 Udhatiar Kandi
 Mirer Mohalla
 Pathan Hatis

Education

College: No
High School: 1  
 Dilalpur Abdul Karim High School, Dilalpur, Bajitpur, Kishorgonj.

Junior High School: No
Madrasa: 2
 Dilalpur Masrasa

Government Primary School: 4
 12 No. Bahernagar Gov. Primary School.

Non-Government Primary School: No

Education Institute Name with Educational Institute Identification No (EIIN)-

•	Dilalpur Abdul Karim High School (EIIN – 110248)

See also
Bajitpur Upazila
Bangladesh Bureau of Statistics

References

Unions of Bajitpur Upazila